George Mocanu (born September 24, 1982) is a politician from Moldova. He has been a member of the Parliament of Moldova since 2010.

References

External links 
 Site-ul Parlamentului Republicii Moldova
 George Mocanu

1982 births
Living people
Liberal Democratic Party of Moldova MPs
Moldovan MPs 2010–2014